Malik Tchokounté (born 11 September 1988) is a French professional footballer who plays as a forward for  club Nîmes.

Club career
A youth product of OGC Nice, Tchokounté was a prolific scorer in the lower divisions of France, before transferring to Paris FC in the Ligue 2 on 4 July 2017. He made his professional debut with Paris FC in a 0–0 Ligue 2 tie with Clermont Foot on 28 July 2017.

On 10 July 2018, Tchokounté joined Stade Malherbe Caen in Ligue 1.

In June 2022, Tchokounté joined Nîmes on a one-year contract.

International career
Tchokounté appeared for the County of Nice national football team at the 2014 ConIFA World Football Cup, and helped them win the tournament for the first time.

Personal life
Tchokounté is of Cameroonian and Guinean descent.

References

External links
 
 
 
 Paris FC Profile

1988 births
Living people
French footballers
French sportspeople of Cameroonian descent
French sportspeople of Guinean descent
Footballers from Nice
Association football forwards
Thurrock F.C. players
USL Dunkerque players
Paris FC players
Stade Malherbe Caen players
Nîmes Olympique players
Championnat National 2 players
Championnat National players
Ligue 2 players
Ligue 1 players
Black French sportspeople
French expatriate footballers
French expatriate sportspeople in England
Expatriate footballers in England